The  Palmer Brother's Octagons are two historic octagonal houses built by brothers, Dr. Horace Palmer and Monroe Palmer in or near West Salem, Wisconsin.

The Palmer-Gullickson Octagon House, the larger of the two, was built in 1856. With the help of Rachel Gullickson the West Salem Historical society was able to buy this house for preservation and use as a museum.  It is located at 358 Leonard St. in West Salem.

The Palmer-Lewis Octagon House was built in 1857.  It has been moved to another location on Leonard Street, and attached to a smaller structure.

On August 7, 1979, they were added to the National Register of Historic Places.

References

External links
 West Salem Historical Society - official site
 Octagon House Inventory - La Crosse County (its text has garbled the two houses into three, but the photo links identify the correct houses)

Houses on the National Register of Historic Places in Wisconsin
Octagon houses in Wisconsin
Houses completed in 1856
Houses completed in 1857
Museums in La Crosse County, Wisconsin
Historic house museums in Wisconsin
Houses in La Crosse County, Wisconsin
National Register of Historic Places in La Crosse County, Wisconsin
1856 establishments in Wisconsin